Xceed may refer to:

Xceed (software company), provider of software components and tools for the Microsoft .NET platform
XCEED, Indian robotics challenge held as a prelude to the Kurukshetra festival
Xceed (professional wrestling), professional wrestling stable

See also
EXceed
Exceed (disambiguation)
Exceeder
Xceedium
Xseed